Walter Lawrence "Gus" Kyle (September 11, 1923 – November 17, 1996) was a Canadian ice hockey defenceman who played 203 games in the National Hockey League for the New York Rangers and Boston Bruins between 1949 and 1952. The rest of his career, which lasted from 1941 to 1956, was spent in different amateur and minor leagues.

Kyle scored six goals in his NHL career, five of them for the New York Rangers.  His other goal was his lone tally for Boston.  It occurred on January 13, 1952 in Boston's 5-4 home win over the Chicago Black Hawks. 

Following the close of his playing career, Kyle coached in the minor professional Western Hockey League and Central Hockey League between 1957 and 1964. He later spent some two decades on the St. Louis Blues radio broadcasting team. Gus is the brother of Bill Kyle.
Prior to the NHL, Kyle was a Royal Canadian Mounted Policeman during the years 1942 - 1947, when he purchased his discharge to play professional hockey.

Career statistics

Regular season and playoffs

External links
 

1923 births
1996 deaths
Boston Bruins players
Calgary Stampeders (WHL) players
Canadian expatriate ice hockey players in the United States
Canadian ice hockey coaches
Canadian ice hockey defencemen
Ice hockey people from Saskatchewan
New York Rangers players
New York Rovers players
Notre Dame Hounds players
National Hockey League broadcasters
St. Louis Blues announcers